Kari Vogt (born 3 April 1939) is a Norwegian religious historian. She has written several books, and been a board member of the Norwegian Academy of Literature and Freedom of Expression, and of the Norwegian chapter of PEN International.

Personal life
Vogt was born in Oslo to physician Erik Theodor Vogt and psychologist Bodil Therese Tandberg, and is a niece of linguist Hans Vogt and electronics engineer Vebjørn Tandberg.

Career
Vogt graduated in religious studies from the University of Oslo in 1965, with the thesis Urmenneskeskikkelsen i de manikeiske Thomas-salmene, and also studied in Paris. She was appointed at the University of Oslo from 1967. 

Her books include Islams hus from 1993, Kommet for å bli from 1995, Reise i Iran from 1997, and Islam på norsk from 2000. She has been board member of the Norwegian Academy of Literature and Freedom of Expression and the Norwegian chapter of PEN International.

She received the Fritt Ord Honorary Award for 1996.

References

1939 births
Living people
Norwegian women historians
Religion academics
University of Oslo alumni
Academic staff of the University of Oslo
20th-century Norwegian historians